The Rennie Football Netball Club is an Australian rules football and netball club based in the southern Riverina town of Rennie. 

The club currently competes in the Picola & District Football League, having previously competed in the Hume Football League and the Coreen & District Football League.

In 1944, there was a Coreen & District Junior Patriotic Football Association with Rennie defeating Coreen in the grand final at Coreen then in 1945 Oaklands defeated Rennie in the grand final which was played at Coreen.

Premierships

VFL / AFL Players
 1956 - Jim Sandral - Melbourne
 1995 - Jeff Bruce - Fitzroy

References

External links
 
 Gameday site
 1939 - Coreen & DFA Premiers: Rennie FC team photo

Picola & District Football League clubs
1936 establishments in Australia
Australian rules football clubs established in 1936